A federal monarchy, in the strict sense, is a federation of states with a single monarch as overall head of the federation, but retaining different monarchs, or having a non-monarchical system of government, in the various states joined to the federation.

As a term in political science
The term was introduced into English political and historical discourse by Edward Augustus Freeman, in his History of Federal Government (1863). Freeman himself thought a federal monarchy only possible in the abstract.

Federal monarchies

Historically
Historically, the most prominent example of a federal monarchy in the Western world was the German Empire (1871–1918) and, to a lesser extent, its predecessors (North German Confederation and German Confederation). The head of state of the federation was a monarch, the German Emperor, who was also head of state of the largest constituent part to the federation as King of Prussia; other constituent monarchies, such as the kingdoms of Bavaria, Saxony and Württemberg and various grand duchies, duchies and principalities, retained their own monarchs and armies. Besides the 23 monarchies (22 constituent monarchies and the German emperor) there were also three republican city-states – Bremen, Hamburg and Lübeck – and Alsace-Lorraine, a semi-autonomous republic since 1912.

In the Eastern Hemisphere, an example is the system of government in India in the 3rd century BCE Maurya Empire, where regional rulers appointed by the emperor headed the regional administration that governed the distant regions of the empire. It was revived in 16th century under the rule of Mughal Emperor Akbar, in which the subahs (other than Delhi) were controlled by subehdars appointed by the emperor and the regional kings. The emperor himself supervised the regional rulers and thus personally looked after the welfare of his people.

The concept played a role in political debates in Italy and Austria-Hungary in the nineteenth century and in Yugoslavia in the twentieth century, but it was not put into effect in any of the cases. For example, modern Italy had not unified until Risorgimento of the late 19th century, with the several smaller kingdoms, duchies, republics, etc., each headed by a different dynasty or ruling class, being disestablished in favor of a unitary monarchy under the house of Savoy.

Currently
Currently, the term can be applied in the fullest sense to the United Arab Emirates and Malaysia. In both, the head of state of the entire federation is selected from among the heads of states (Emir, Sultan or Raja, respectively) who rule the constituent states of the federation.

While not officially declared as such, Spain has been referred to as a federal monarchy, due to having many autonomous communities helmed by presidents who all answer to the Spanish crown. Officially, Spain is a unitary state displaying a high degree of devolution.

Several Communities, regions and language areas constitute the Kingdom of Belgium, a federal state with a constitutional monarchy.

List of federal monarchies (in the strict sense)

See also
 Form of government
 List of monarchies
 Federal republic

References

External links

Monarchism
Monarchy